German Social Union may refer to:

German Social Union (East Germany), a conservative opposition group
German Social Union (West Germany), a Strasserite group